McLean Electric Cooperative is a public utility cooperative based in Garrison, North Dakota.  It serves rural consumers in McLean County and portions of Sheridan and Mountrail counties. It receives power from the Central Power Electric Cooperative.

External links
McLean Electric Cooperative site

Electric cooperatives in North Dakota
McLean County, North Dakota
Electric power companies of the United States
Companies based in North Dakota